Summer in Kingston is the tenth studio album released by Jamaican dancehall artist Shaggy.

Background
The album was first released via digital download on 19 July 2011, containing a total of eight tracks. Shaggy described the album as a "Summer follow-up" to Shaggy & Friends, which was released in January 2011. The album was mostly produced by Shaggy. The album's lead single, "Fired Up (Fuck the Rece$$ion!)", was released on 8 March 2011, and features vocals from Cuban-American rapper Pitbull. The album's second single, "Sugarcane", was released just three days prior to the album, and was produced by Teflon, formerly of hip-hop's Ruff Ryders Crew, and the producer of Eve's worldwide smash hit "Who's That Girl". The album was priced at $2.99 for a limited time through iTunes, Amazon and other major digital outlets, however, this promotion ended on Labor Day. In 2012, Shaggy announced plans to release a 'Lava edition' of the album on 7 February 2012, this time being issued both physically and via digital download. The 'Lava edition' was preceded by the album's third single, a new version of "Dame" featuring Kat DeLuna. The 'Lava edition' contains two brand new songs - "Hurting" and "She Gives Me Love", featuring Sly & Robbie.

Track listing

References

2011 albums
Shaggy (musician) albums